The Baoji–Zhongwei railway is a railway line in northwest China: it starts in Baoji in Shaanxi, passes through Pingliang in Gansu and finally ends in Zhenluobao (镇罗堡) in Zhongwei in Ningxia, with a total length of 498.19 kilometres. Construction on the railway started in 1990 and track laying was completed on 10 July 1994. It was electrified and opened in the following year on 8 June 1995. The railway is under the jurisdiction of the Xi'an Railway Bureau in Shaanxi and the Lanzhou Railway Bureau in Gansu and Ningxia. The line is  single-track and electrified. It is a key line connecting Shaanxi, Gansu and Ningxia.

There are plans to make the line double-tracked and increase the maximum speed to 160 km/h.

Route 
The line starts at Guozhen station in Qianwei town near Baoji and ends at Yinshuiqiao  station just west of Zhongwei, traversing 14 counties and cities in Shaanxi, Gansu and Ningxia.

Main stations 
 Baoji railway station
 Qianyang
 Qixian
 Huating
 Pingliang
 Guyuan
 Tongxin
 Zhongwei

See also 

 Yinchuan–Xi'an high-speed railway, an alternative route between Shaanxi and Ningxia through Gansu
Xi'an–Pingliang railway

References 

Railway lines in China
Rail transport in Shaanxi
Rail transport in Gansu
Rail transport in Ningxia
Railway lines opened in 1996